Alikeh (also Romanized as ‘Alīkeh; also known as ‘Alīgeh) is a village in Gurani Rural District, Gahvareh District, Dalahu County, Kermanshah Province, Iran. At the 2006 census, its population was 81, in 19 families.

References 

Populated places in Dalahu County